The 2007–08 Oregon Ducks men's basketball team represents the University of Oregon in the college basketball season of 2007–08. The team was coached by Ernie Kent and plays their home games at McArthur Court.

Previous season
The 2006–07 Oregon Ducks experienced what many would argue as one of their most memorable and successful seasons in school history. Freshman Tajuan Porter, who was not heavily recruited, along with senior and leader Aaron Brooks helped lead the Ducks to a successful season. They began their season by completing their non-conference schedule at a perfect 12–0, including a come-from-behind win at Rice and an important east-coast win at then ranked #19 Georgetown. The Ducks suffered their first loss of the season against USC but were able to bounce back and defeat then ranked #1 UCLA marking the second time in school history the Ducks had defeated a #1 Bruins team. Towards the end of the season Oregon suffered a streak in which they lost 6 of 8 games, the skid dropped the Ducks from #7 to #23 in the AP Poll. However the Ducks managed to bounce back, winning 9 games in a row, including a sweep of the Pac-10 Championship Tournament – in dominating fashion – first round wins over Miami University (Ohio), Winthrop University, and a Sweet Sixteen victory over UNLV. Their final game of the season was a 77–85 loss to eventual NCAA men's basketball tournament champions, Florida.

Pre-season
June 28 – Aaron Brooks was selected in the 2007 NBA draft as the 26th selection overall during the 1st round by the Houston Rockets.

July – Guard Tajuan Porter played on the United States' U19 team in the 2007 FIBA U19 World Championship. The tournament was played in Novi Sad, Serbia and the United States' team placed 2nd, suffering their first loss of the tournament to Serbia 69–74 in the championship game. Also, Forward Maarty Leunen played on the United States' Pan American Games team. The team place 5th in the tournament after a poor 3–2 final record in which the team lost the first two games.

November 1 – During the Pac-10's media day, the pre-season media poll picks the Ducks to finish third in the Pac-10.

Recruiting
The 2008 University of Oregon Men's Basketball Recruiting Class was selected by Scout.com as the 11th best recruiting class of 2008 and was selected by Rivals.com as the 11th best recruiting class of 2008 as well.

Class of 2008 Recruits

Schedule

|-
!colspan=6 style="background:#004F27; color:yellow;"| Pac-10 tournament

|-
!colspan=6 style="background:#004F27; color:yellow;"| NCAA tournament

Roster

Centers
3 Mitch Platt – Senior – Henderson, Nev.
45 Ray Schafer – Senior – Wasilla, Alaska

Forwards
10 Maarty Leunen – Senior – Redmond, Ore.
11 Frantz Dorsainvil – Junior – Montreal, Quebec
33 Drew Viney – Freshman – Villa Park, Calif.
50 Joevan Catron – Sophomore – Phoenix, Ill.

Guards
1 Malik Hairston – Senior – Detroit, Mich.
4 Bryce Taylor – Senior – Encino, Calif.
4 Ben Voogd – Junior – Florence, Ore.
12 Tajuan Porter – Sophomore – Detroit, Mich.
13 Churchill Odia – Junior – Lagos, Nigeria
15 John Elorriaga – Freshman – Portland, Ore.
21 Nicholas Fearn – Freshman – Seattle, Wash.
24 LeKendric Longmire – Freshman – Pascagoula, Miss.
34 Kamyron Brown – Freshman – Santa Ana, Calif.

Coaching staff

Ernie Kent – Head Coach
Mark Hudson – Assistant Coach
Kenny Payne – Assistant Coach
Yasir Rosemond – Assistant Coach
Josh Jamieson – Director of Basketball Operations
Clay Jamieson – Athletic Trainer
Nathan Bain – Manager
H.J. Cohn – Student Manager
David Flasch – Manager
Shawn Harriett – Manager
Josh Suh – Manager

Season Notes

Awards
Malik Hairston
Named as one of the John R. Wooden Award's pre-season top 50 candidates.

Records
On December 3, the Oregon Ducks men's basketball team set the school record for most consecutive weeks ranked in the AP Poll as a Top-25 team. Oregon had been ranked by the AP since December 11, 2006, which was a total of 19 polls released with the Ducks in the Top-25. The previous record was 18 weeks, set between February 4, 2002, and January 27, 2003.

Game notes
Pepperdine @ Oregon

Pacific @ Oregon

Western Michigan @ Oregon

Oregon @ Portland

Oregon @ Saint Mary's

San Francisco @ Oregon

Oregon @ Kansas State

Utah @ Oregon

Sacramento @ Oregon

Oregon @ Nebraska

Oregon vs. Oakland

Stats

Team

Scores by half

Individual

Glossary

GP: Games Played, MIN: Minutes, FGM: Field goals made, FGA: Field goals attempted, FTM: Free throws made, FTA: Free throws attempted, 3PM: 3-pointers made, 3PA: 3-pointers attempted, PTS: Points, OFF: Offensive rebounds, DEF: Defensive rebounds, REB: Rebounds, TOT: Total rebounds AST: Assists, TO: Turnovers, STL: Steals, BLK: Blocks, PF: Personal fouls

References

Oregon Ducks men's basketball seasons
Oregon Ducks
Oregon
Oregon
Oregon